The RS-88 is a liquid-fueled rocket engine burning ethanol as fuel, and using liquid oxygen (LOX) as the oxidizer.  It was designed and built by Rocketdyne, originally for the NASA Bantam System Technology program (1997).

In 2003, it was designated by Lockheed for their pad abort demonstration (PAD) vehicle. NASA tested the RS-88 in a series of 14 hot-fire tests, resulting in 55 seconds of successful engine operation in November and December 2003.

A hypergolic derivative of the RS-88 has been selected for the Boeing CST-100 Starliner launch escape system. This version is capable of 39,700lbf (176.6kN) of thrust and four are used in Starliner's abort system.

Bantam Launch System 
The Bantam System Technology Project, which is part of the Low Cost Technologies effort, teams NASA and its business partners to research and demonstrate technologies for a new low-cost launch system. A technology demonstration flight was targeted for late 1999.

The RS-88 engine was designed by Rocketdyne under NASA's Bantam program which was the propulsion element of the low-cost technologies of the larger Advanced Space Transportation Program.

Boeing CST-100 

The launch escape system for Boeing's CST-100 spacecraft uses a lightweight, hypergolic derivative of the RS-88 called the Launch Abort Engine (LAE).

See also 
 NASA Advanced Space Transportation Program
 CST-100
 Constellation program
 Merlin (rocket engine)

References

External links 

 Marshall SFC Star June 11, 1997.
 RS-88 PAD Testing at NASA MSFC May 2005, AIAA

Rocket engines using alcohol propellant
Rocketdyne engines
Rocket engines of the United States
Rocket engines using the pressure-fed cycle